Daniil Dmitrievich Misyul (born October 20, 2000) is a Belarusian-born Russian ice hockey defenceman who is currently under contract with Lokomotiv Yaroslavl of the Kontinental Hockey League.

Misyul made his KHL debut for Lokomotiv Yaroslavl during the 2018–19 KHL season, playing three games. He was drafted 70th overall by the New Jersey Devils in the 2019 NHL Entry Draft.

Career statistics

Regular season and playoffs

International

Awards and honours

References

External links

2000 births
Living people
Belarusian ice hockey players
Lokomotiv Yaroslavl players
New Jersey Devils draft picks
Russian ice hockey defencemen
Ice hockey people from Minsk